is a Japanese amateur astronomer and a discoverer of minor planets at the Nanyo Observatory, Yamagata prefecture, Japan.

He is a prolific discoverer of asteroids, credited by the Minor Planet Center with a total of 130 discoveries between 1995 and 2000.

The main-belt asteroid 7769 Okuni, discovered by Satoru Otomo at the Kiyosato Observatory in 1991, is named in his honour. Naming citation was published on 9 January 2001.

List of discovered minor planets

See also

References 
 

1931 births
Discoverers of asteroids

20th-century Japanese astronomers
Living people